Loibl may refer to:

 Loibl Pass, mountain pass in the Alps, linking Austria with Slovenia
 Loibl Formation, geologic formation in Austria
 Kevin James Loibl, assassin of Christina Grimmie
 Torsten Loibl (born 1972), German basketball coach

See also
 Loidl